White River State Park is an urban park in downtown Indianapolis, Indiana. The park is home to numerous attractions, including the Eiteljorg Museum of American Indians and Western Art, Indiana State Museum, Indianapolis Zoo, NCAA Hall of Champions, Victory Field, and White River Gardens.

The park and accompanying Indianapolis Canal Walk comprise one of seven designated cultural districts.

History
Initial plans for the park were conceived by civic leaders in the late-1970s to capitalize on the city's amateur sports economic development strategy. Bipartisan support from state legislators and seed money from corporate partners led to the organization of a quasi-governmental commission to oversee planning and operations for the park. Construction began in the 1980s with the acquisition and clearing of blighted industrial properties and realignment of Washington Street for redevelopment.

Restoration of this area began in the late 1980s when public attention fell on the Indiana Central Canal. The canal was originally engineered in the 1830s as a way to ship goods through the state of Indiana, but the project, as governed by the Indiana Mammoth Internal Improvement Act, went bankrupt and the Indianapolis section of the canal was the only section that was ever dug. Although the canal was never used for its intended purpose, recent restoration and development have allowed the area to function as a cultural center within the city.

In 1980, architect César Pelli's Indiana Tower was proposed as the park's focal point; however, the  observation tower was never constructed due to funding concerns and public criticism of the tower's design. Since, several proposed attractions have been considered, including an Indiana African American History Museum, seasonal ice skating rink, tethered balloon ride, amusement park, and public beach.

The new parkland will hug the west riverbank and incorporate a portion of the former plant's preserved crane bay. The crane bay was designed by industrial architect Albert Kahn.

Ownership and operations
White River State Park is owned by the State of Indiana under the auspices of the White River State Park Development Commission, a quasi-governmental board composed of 12 commissioners. The commission is charged with overseeing park maintenance, marketing, operations, and future development. The commission was created in 1979 by the Indiana General Assembly to distinguish the park from those managed by the Indiana Department of Natural Resources. Management of the park's 800-space underground parking garage and 200-space surface parking lot has been outsourced to Reef Technology.

Attractions

Historic Pumphouse
1870 – Opened as the original water pumping station for the city of Indianapolis
1969 – Pumping station closed
1980 – Accepted for inclusion on the National Register of Historic Places
1981 – Reopened as the park's headquarters and visitors' center after renovations

White River State Park Visitors' Center (Dr. Frank P. Lloyd Sr. Visitors Center)
2003 – Opened

Indianapolis Zoo
1988 – Park’s first attraction established

White River Gardens
1999 – Opened

Historic Washington Street Pedestrian Bridge
1916 – Opened as part of the National Road
1994 – Historic National Road U.S. 40 previously linking the U.S. from east to west start renovations
1999 – Art Sculptures in the Park began

NCAA Headquarters and Hall of Champions Museum
1999–2000 – Relocated to Indianapolis from Kansas City

National Federation of State High School Associations Headquarters (NFHS)
1999–2000 – Relocated to Indianapolis from Kansas City

Indiana State Museum
2002 – Opened

IMAX 3D Theatre
1996 – Opened as Indiana's only IMAX theatre and still the largest IMAX theatre in Indiana

Medal of Honor Memorial
1999 – Opened

Military Park
1822 – Site of Indianapolis's first documented 4th of July celebration
1852 – Site of first Indiana State Fair
1861 – Civil War encampment until 1865

Indiana Historical Society
1830 – Founded.
1999 – Current building near White River State Park opened in 1999

State Capitol Building and Government Complex
Not one of the park's attractions, but located next to it and open to the public

Eiteljorg Museum of American Indians and Western Art
1989 – Opened as the park’s second attraction
2005 – Opened expanded gallery space, education facility, performance/special event areas, and indoor/outdoor dining restaurant doubled the museum's size

Victory Field
1996 – Opened as home of the Indianapolis Indians

White River State Park Concert Series
2004 – Opened inaugural summer concert season at a temporary concert venue, the 7,500-seat "Farm Bureau Insurance Lawn"
2007 – Doubled concert attendance with 50,000+ spectators, included 11 shows
2018 - Plans to replace temporary structure announced by White River State Park Development Commission
2019 - Construction begun on $27 million "The TCU Amphitheater at White River State Park", with 3,000 permanent seats and a general admission lawn area for 4,500, to be completed in June 2020

Indiana Cross Country Arena
2007 – White River State Park partners with the Indiana Invaders, Indy Greenways, Indianapolis Parks, the National Institute for Fitness & Sport (NIFS), local and international businesses, and community partners to revitalize the flood plain green space along the White River for education, health, and recreation opportunities.
2008 – Opened unofficially in August with nine meets and invitationals
2008 – Middle school (National Middle School Championships), high school (City of Indianapolis Championships), and youth (Indiana USA Track and Field Junior Olympics) teams compete
2010 – Anticipated official inaugural season in late summer

See also
White River Park State Games
List of Indiana state parks
List of parks in Indianapolis
List of attractions and events in Indianapolis

Notes

References

External links

TCU Amphitheater at White River State Park

 
State parks of Indiana
Parks in Indianapolis
Culture of Indianapolis
Protected areas established in 1979
1979 establishments in Indiana
Music venues in Indiana